Hello Airlines is a cargo airline from Bangladesh. It was founded in 2012 and commenced operations in 2017. The airline has its main hub at the Shahjalal International Airport and its fleet comprises one ATR 42-300 QC aircraft.

Fleet

The Hello Airlines fleet consists of the following aircraft (at August 2019):

See also
 List of airlines of Bangladesh
 List of airports in Bangladesh

References

External links

 Official website 

Airlines established in 2012
Airlines of Bangladesh
Bangladeshi companies established in 2012